John Patrick Lyon MBE (born 9 March 1962) is a retired boxer from Great Britain.

Boxing career
A member of the Greenall St. Helens Amateur Boxing Club he competed at the 1984 Summer Olympics and 1988 Summer Olympics. He represented England and won a silver medal in the light flyweight division, at the 1982 Commonwealth Games in Brisbane, Queensland, Australia. Four years later he represented England again and won a gold medal in the men's flyweight division (– 48 kg), at the 1986 Commonwealth Games in Edinburgh, Scotland. He appeared at a third consecutive games in 1990.

Lyon won eight English ABA titles, four flyweight and four light-flyweight and a bronze medal in the 1991 Acropolis Cup, retiring immediately afterwards.

He was awarded an MBE for services to amateur boxing.

1988 Olympic results
Below is the record of John Lyon, a British flyweight boxer who competed at the 1988 Seoul Olympics:

 Round of 64: lost to Ramazan Gul (Turkey) by decision, 1-4

Personal life
Lyon's son Craig Lyon also won the English light-flyweight title, twice. He also competed in the Prizefighter tournament at super-flyweight in 2011, but was defeated by Ryan Farrag in the quarter finals.

References

1962 births
Living people
English male boxers
Flyweight boxers
Olympic boxers of Great Britain
Boxers at the 1984 Summer Olympics
Boxers at the 1988 Summer Olympics
Boxers at the 1982 Commonwealth Games
Boxers at the 1986 Commonwealth Games
Boxers at the 1990 Commonwealth Games
Commonwealth Games gold medallists for England
Commonwealth Games silver medallists for England
Place of birth missing (living people)
Commonwealth Games medallists in boxing
Members of the Order of the British Empire
England Boxing champions
Medallists at the 1982 Commonwealth Games
Medallists at the 1986 Commonwealth Games